The Karnataka State Film Awards 2011, presented by Government of Karnataka, to felicitate the best of Kannada Cinema released in the year 2011.(wrong link)

Lifetime achievement award

Jury 

A committee headed by Sunil Kumar Desai was appointed to evaluate the feature films awards.

Film Awards

Other Awards

References

Karnataka State Film Awards